James Trifunov (July 18, 1903 – June 27, 1993) was a Canadian freestyle sport wrestler who competed in the 1924 Summer Olympics, in the 1928 Summer Olympics, and in the 1932 Summer Olympics. His parents Mr. and Mrs. Rade Trifunov came from Jarkovac, Austria-Hungary, now Serbia, to Canada in March 1902 and settled in Truax, Saskatchewan, where James was born the following year.

Biography
Of Serbian descent, Jim Trifunov began his career as a newsboy in Regina, later he took up wrestling at his local YMCA in 1922. One year later he had won his first of nine almost-consecutive Canadian bantamweight championships, missing only the 1931 edition due to an injury. His successes sent him to three editions of the Olympic Games, the most notable of which was in 1928, when he captured a bronze medal by overcoming Harold Sansum of Great Britain in the match for the bronze medal. He also won a gold medal in the bantamweight division at the inaugural 1930 British Empire Games by defeating Joseph Reid of England. He retired from active competition following the 1932 Olympic Games and resumed his career with Regina's Leader-Post. In 1936 he was sent by the Sifton Publishing Company from Regina to Winnipeg to work with the city's Winnipeg Free Press, where he would remain for the rest of his life. While there he took up coaching and sports administration, eventually serving as president of the Manitoba Wrestling Association for a quarter of a century. He also held executive roles in the Canadian Amateur Wrestling Association and Manitoba Wrestling associations and was coach and manager of Canada's wrestling delegations to 1952, 1956, and 1960 Summer Olympics, as well as every edition of the British Empire Games between 1954 and 1970. Among his many honors, he was made a member of the Order of Canada in 1981 and has been inducted into the Canadian Olympic in 1953, Canada's Sports Hall of Fame in 1960, and the Saskatchewan Sports Hall of Fame in 1966. Also, he was inducted into the Manitoba Sports Hall of Fame in 1981.

His voluntary activities and initiatives have included school-crossing patrols, which have spread across the continent.

Certificates and awards

 The Amateur Athletic Union of Canada certificate to Jim Trifunov for his work with the youth of Canada and his fellow sportsmen (Archives Canada). 
 British Columbia 1958 Centennial award to Jim Trifunov for the Canadian Amateur Wrestling Championships (Archives Canada). 
 An Award presented to Jim Trifunov by the Manitoba Sports Federation for a builder of sport (Archives Canada). 
 Card that reads Canadian Amateur Wrestling Hall of Fame James "Jim" Trifunov Admitted March 16, 1975 (Archives Canada). 
 Canadian Amateur Wrestling Association James Trifunov Air Canada Sports Award for Executive of the Year (Archives Canada).

References

External links
 http://www.sportshall.ca/stories.html?proID=451&catID=all

1903 births
1993 deaths
People from Sečanj
People from the Kingdom of Hungary
Austro-Hungarian emigrants to Canada
Canadian people of Serbian descent
Olympic wrestlers of Canada
Olympic bronze medalists for Canada
Olympic medalists in wrestling
Wrestlers at the 1924 Summer Olympics
Wrestlers at the 1928 Summer Olympics
Wrestlers at the 1932 Summer Olympics
Canadian male sport wrestlers
Wrestlers at the 1930 British Empire Games
Commonwealth Games gold medallists for Canada
Medalists at the 1928 Summer Olympics
Sportspeople from Winnipeg
Members of the Order of Canada
Commonwealth Games medallists in wrestling
Medallists at the 1930 British Empire Games